Sumyafaʿ (or Sumūyafaʿ) Ashwaʿ (Greek: Esimiphaios, Latin: Esimiphaeus) was the king of Ḥimyar under the Aksumite Empire from 525/531 until 535.

There is an inscription commemorating the refortification of Qanīʾ from February 530 or 531 by a Sumūyafaʿ Ashwaʿ and his sons Shuriḥbiʾīl Yakmul and Maʿdīkarib Yaʿfur. He was the son of Laḥayʿat Yarkham, from western Ḥimyar and had been in exile in Aksum, only returning with the Aksumite invasion force. It is not certain that this was the same Sumūyafaʿ Ashwaʿ who was or became king of Ḥimyar.

It is not possible to be precise about the date of accession of Sumūyafaʿ Ashwaʿ. A native Ḥimyarite and a Christian, he was appointed by the Aksumite king Caleb, who had defeated and killed the previous king of Ḥimyar, Dhū Nuwās, sometime between Pentecost 525 and February 531. A fragmentary inscription appears to give his full title as "king of Sabaʾ, of dhu-Raydān, of Ḥaḍramawt, and of Yamnat, and of their Arabs of the Upper Country and of the Coast". The text records the founding of a building, probably a church. After his victory, Caleb returned to Aksum but left part of his army behind as a garrison.

The Roman emperor Justinian I sent two embassies to Ḥimyar during the brief reign of Sumūyafaʿ Ashwaʿ. Sometime between April and September 531, he sent an embassy to the court of Aksum and to Sumūyafaʿ Ashwaʿ, hoping for an alliance against Persia and for Ḥimyarite aid to the Roman ally Qays ibn Salama ibn al-Ḥārith. The Roman historian Procopius details the embassy of the ambassador Julian:
At that time, when Hellesthaeus [Caleb] was reigning over the Aethiopians [Aksumites], and Esimiphaeus over the Homeritae [Ḥimyarites], the Emperor Justinian sent an ambassador, Julianus, demanding that both nations on account of their community of religion should make common cause with the Romans in the war against the Persians. . . As for the Homeritae, it was desired that they should establish Caïsus [Qays], the fugitive, as captain over the Maddeni [Maʿadd], and with a great army of their own people and of the Maddene Saracens make an invasion into the land of the Persians. This Caïsus was by birth of the captain’s rank and an exceptionally able warrior, but he had killed one of the relatives of Esimiphaeus and was a fugitive in a land which is so utterly destitute of human habitation. So each king, promising to put this demand into effect, dismissed the ambassador, but neither one of them did the things agreed upon by them.
A little later Nonnosos was sent on a mission to Kinda and Aksum, but "in addition to these goals [he was] to visit the Ameritae", that is, the Ḥimyarites. In 535, ʾAbreha, the commander of the Aksumite forces in Ḥimyar, revolted and overthrew Sumūyafaʿ Ashwaʿ, who was imprisoned in a fortress. Caleb sent two further military expeditions to restore Sumūyafaʿ Ashwaʿ, but both ended in failure. The details of these events are found in Procopius. In the 540s, when ʾAbreha had inscriptions added to the Maʾrib Dam to commemorate its repair, he noted his victory over a son of Sumūyafaʿ Ashwaʿ.

The Aryāṭ of later Islamic accounts may be based on Sumūyafaʿ Ashwaʿ. Later Christian historiography generally omitted Sumūyafaʿ Ashwaʿ in order not exposed ʾAbreha—a Christian hero in these accounts—as a usurper. This often extended to falsely lengthening the reign of ʾAbreha to include that of his predecessor. Thus, Sumūyafaʿ Ashwaʿ is not mentioned in the Martyrion of Arethas, the Bios of Gregentios, the Chronographia of Theophanes of Byzantium or the Chronicle of Michael the Syrian. On the basis of the Laws of the Ḥimyarites, part of the Bios of Gregentios, Irfan Shahîd argued that Sumūyafaʿ Ashwaʿ took the throne name Abraham, causing confusion between him and his successor because of the similarity of their names.

References

Bibliography

6th-century Arabs
Kings of Himyar
Middle Eastern kings
Arab Christians